Masha Hamilton is a United States journalist and the author of five novels. She founded two world literacy projects, and has worked as head of communications for the US Embassy in Afghanistan and the NGO Concern Worldwide US.

Career
Hamilton worked as a foreign correspondent for the Associated Press for five years in the Middle East, where she covered the First Intifada, the peace process, and the partial Israeli withdrawal from Lebanon. She spent five years in Moscow, where she was a Los Angeles Times correspondent and reported for NBC/Mutual Radio. She wrote about politics as well as average Russian's life during the collapse of the Soviet Union. She reported from Afghanistan in both 2004 and 2008.

In 2006, she traveled in Kenya to research the novel The Camel Bookmobile (2007), published by HarperCollins. She had previously published the books Staircase of a Thousand Steps (2001), The Distance Between Us (2004), 31 Hours (2009), and What Changes Everything (2013).

World literacy projects
She started two world literacy projects: the Camel Book Drive  to help the camel-powered library in Northeast Kenya, begun in 2007, and the Afghan Women's Writing Project, to foster the voices of Afghan women, begun in 2009.

Awards
In 2010, she won the Women’s National Book Association WNBA Award.
In 2013, she was received Meritorious and Superior Awards from the State Department.
In 2017, she was the John E Nance 2017 Writer-In-Residence at the Thurber House.

Major works
 Postcard from Moscow, (newspaper column)
 Staircase of a Thousand Steps, (2001), Penguin Putnam/BlueHen Books
 The Distance Between Us, (2004) Unbridled Books
 The Camel Bookmobile, (2007) HarperCollins
 31 Hours, (2009) Unbridled Books
 What Changes Everything, (2013) Unbridled Books

References

External links
 Masha Hamilton's home page
 The Afghan Women's Writing Project
 

21st-century American novelists
American women novelists
Living people
Los Angeles Times people
1961 births
American women journalists
21st-century American women writers
21st-century American non-fiction writers